The Southern Paiute people are a tribe of Native Americans who have lived in the Colorado River basin of southern Nevada, northern Arizona, and southern Utah. Bands of Southern Paiute live in scattered locations throughout this territory and have been granted federal recognition on several reservations.

The first European contact with the Southern Paiute occurred in 1776, when fathers Silvestre Vélez de Escalante and Francisco Atanasio Domínguez encountered them during an attempt to find an overland route to the missions of California. They noted that some of the Southern Paiute men "had thick beards and were thought to look more in appearance like Spanish men than native Americans". Before this date, the Southern Paiute suffered slave raids by the Navajo and the Ute. The arrival of Spanish and later Euro-American explorers into their territory increased slave raiding by other tribes. In 1851, Mormon settlers strategically occupied Paiute water sources, which created a dependency relationship. However, the presence of Mormon settlers soon ended the slave raids, and relations between the Paiutes and the Mormons were basically peaceful. The Mormon missionary Jacob Hamblin worked at diplomatic efforts. The introduction of European settlers and agricultural practices (most especially large herds of cattle) made it difficult for the Southern Paiute to continue their traditional lifestyle, as it drove away the game and reduced their ability to hunt, as well as to gather natural foods.

Today Southern Paiute communities are located at Las Vegas, Pahrump, and Moapa, in Nevada; Cedar City, Kanosh, Koosharem, Shivwits, and Indian Peaks, in Utah; at Kaibab and Willow Springs, in Arizona.

Public relations

Early policy 
Prior to the 1850s the Paiute people lived relatively peacefully with the other Native American groups. These groups included the Navajo, Ute, and Hopi tribes. Though there was the occasional tension and violent outbreaks between groups, Paiutes were mainly able to live in peace with other tribes and settlers due to their loose social structure. Most Paiutes lived in small familial groups, and only gathered together in large settings for matters of trade and commerce. Prior to the 1850s, their biggest antagonists were raiders from competing tribes; such as the Navajos, Utes, and Hopis. The Navajos were particularly known for intruding on Paiute grazing land and engaging in raids to capture Paiute women and children for slave trade.

Prior to the 1860s, there had been no long-term development of the land. Most of the non-native contact they had was with transient militants or traders.  Paiutes fought hard to defend their ancestral lands, and at first were successful in driving the settlers out. During the second half of the 1800s, the most prominent groups to migrate to Paiute lands were members and missionaries from The Church of Jesus Christ of Latter Day Saints and silver miners in Pioche, Nevada. In 1869, a rich investor named François Louis Alfred Pioche invested in a silver mine in the town of Pioche, which initially depended upon cheap Paiute labor to work in the mines. The conditions in the mines caused a dramatic decline in the Paiute population. Paiute children were mandated to attend American schools, which attempted to assimilate them as much as possible. By the early 1900s, there were approximately 800 Paiute people.

Modern relations 
In the 1950s, the Indian termination policies of the federal government stripped the Paiutes of their health and educational benefits, federal tax protection, and agricultural assistance. This left them on their own in a weak and unstable state. The first attempt of reconciliation was made in 1980, with the Restoration Act, which recognized the Paiutes as a tribe. It united the five main bands into one tribe: the Cedars, Indian Peaks, Kanosh, Koosharem, and Shivwits. The bill also restored the bands to a system of federal aid and support.

Culture

Basket weaving 
One of the most important skills the women of the Paiute tribes had was their basket weaving skills. They would often use red-stemmed willows to weave their baskets. These skills were used in almost every aspect of their lives, and the skill is believed to have been passed down from mother to daughter for at least 9,000 years. When they would go to gather and forage they would carry large conical baskets on their back to collect things.
 Specific tools were created including ones to strip fruit off of bushes and trees, ones used for winnowing, and ones used to get to roots better. They would also tightly weave these big baskets with clay and resin to create cooking pots and water jugs. Oftentimes, smaller tools were left behind, whereas bigger products such as cooking pots went with the families as they moved around. Based on the region the families were located determined different uses for the weaving. For instance, those who lived by marshes learned to create duck decoys, nets, and rafts to better hunt the water fowl. Another use for this skill was to create their houses. They would use long thin grasses to tightly weave stalks of Cattails together, and in doing so they created these long board-like sections of grasses that they would set up around long willow limbs stuck in the ground.

Traditional diet 

A staple food for the Southern Paiutes was the bitterroot. They also depended on wild carrot, wild onion, and chokecherries. Chokecherries were useful in more ways than one- their stems were brewed to make a sweet drink, and their berries would be crushed, then dried to be saved for later. When Aphids came and swarmed the cane plants, they would leave small drops of nectar where they punctured the cane stalk. Knowing this the Southern Paiute women would take the cane rods and beat them until the small dried droplets came loose. These droplets were then tossed in a winnowing dish to be separated from the remnants of the cane. Often these small particles were the main income of sweetness for the people. Another seed they would gather are waada seeds, minuscule black seeds that would be ground up into meal. Those who lived in a region with an adequate water supply would set up farms, complete with ditch irrigation. The biggest crops were maize, squash and wheat. The men were the primary hunters, they would hunt waterfowl, rabbits, bighorn sheep and other mammals in the regions they passed through.

Paiute archery

Bows
There is a bow collected by the Smithsonian Institution in 1872. Made from a hardwood branch, possibly Mesquite or mountain mahogany, and is 38 5/8 inches from tip to tip. The bow is round in cross section, and the string is two ply sinew. It has a sinew back, and the sinew has been stained with a reddish brown ochre. The bow is utilitarian and still has carving marks, as to be expected of a practical weapon in a hostile and harsh desert environment.
Another photograph is taken of a Paiute bow and arrow.

Arrows
A set of Paiute arrows was acquired by the Smithsonian Institution in 1874. Only one arrow has a point. The arrowhead is attached by pine pitch glue. There are sinew wrappings behind the point, but they are to prevent the shaft from splitting when the target is hit. The feathers are hawk and buzzard.

Quivers and bowcases
A Paiute arrow quiver was acquired by the Smithsonian Institution in 1872. The quiver is made of deerskin with thick hair still on the case, showing the deer was killed in the winter, and is sewn with two ply sinew, much like the bowstring. "The quiver is plain, with no decoration, as would be expected of a desert dwelling culture."

Organization of the Southern Paiute people 
One important aspect of gathering food was the social aspect, often families would come together for foraging and games and then depart and go their different ways. The Southern Paiutes were not organized tribally. Groups were instead made up of small family units that would occasionally come together with others to socialize. Each group was about 10-50 related people. Family ties were very important to these groups and determined group movements and interdependence among groups. Marriages were thus very important to the Southern Paiutes.

The leader of the group was called a Headman, and he would be old enough to know a lot about the land, but young enough to still participate in the tribes activities, and he usually had several different family ties within the group. His job was to wake early in the morning, and using his knowledge he would make specific suggestions of what he thought the tribe should do that day, and if people thought his observations were astute they would follow him, if not then they wouldn't. His suggestions would be based on the weather, season, and abundance of food. If over time they stopped following his ideas and instead turned to another, then the Headman leader title would move onto that person. The Headman also was supposed to settle any disputes that came up. Oftentimes different sub-units of the Southern Paiutes would be classified by the settlers coming in from Europe based on what they ate. So you had those who ate waada seeds, those who ate trout, those who ate cattails, etc. While the Southern Paiute people are categorized as one group, there were subgroups within the whole that were differentiated based on location and dialect.

Subgroups Within Southern Paiute People 
The Southern Paiute People consist of several subgroups that are each unique in language, location, practices, lifestyle, and tradition. In the following sections, three Southern Paiute People subgroups are discussed: the Owens Valley Paiute, Kaibab Paiute, and Chemeheuvi Paiute. The Owens Valley Paiute reside in Owens Valley, CA and rely on water and irrigation in their society. The Kaibab Paiute occupied northern Arizona and southern Utah, organizing around permanent water sources; however, the remaining Kaibab Paiute are located in the Kaibab Indian Reservation. The Chemeheuvi, located in the Great Basin and Southwest United States, intertwine water and land ownership in songs that are considered contractually obliging in the community. Water management is seen as an important role within Chemeheuvi communities and is held in high regard.

Owens Valley Paiute 
While the Owens Valley Paiute are categorized as one unified group, multiple, distinct Paiute districts formed throughout the region, each varying in complexity and organization. Each district developed through own political and housing systems, and established hunting and seed rights. Historical documents estimate that Owens Valley Paiute subgroup populations totaled to maintain approximately 1,000 members.

Diet & Fishing Practices 
Owens Valley Paiute people relied on seasonal fishing and hunting, native vegetation and early agricultural yields, seeds, and nuts to compose their diet. They utilized complex cooking and storage processes to prolong and prepare their harvests and kills. Fishing regulations in the Owens Valley Paiute region depended upon the agreed upon rights within each district. Owens Valley Paiute people utilized an early form of water and property rights by districts declaring ownership of certain stretches of river where they would prohibit outsiders from fishing unless permitted otherwise. Fishing expeditions could be individual or communal activities. Some districts would equally distribute fish catches throughout the district, while others respected that individuals who caught fish got to keep it. Owens Valley Paiute people employed multiple methods in order to catch fish. More traditional practices included using wooden arrows to pierce fish, baskets and nets to trap and collect fish, and utilizing materials to construct early fishing poles. Owens Valley Paiute people created hooks using bone (preferably from deer or wildcats) and used grasshoppers or worms as bait. Natives also built two-pronged spears composed of either obsidian or wood to catch fish. These tools were typically used when people fished at night where fires were lit along rivers to attract fish to the shores for easy catching. Stranding was a technique that required people to remove water from a separated body of water from the river, allowing them to collect fish who failed to escape. They also used a method, titled stupefying, involved natives adding and diffusing slim solomon into water systems which would disorient fish and allowed them to collect the fish easily.

Irrigation 
Owens Valley Paiute people's knowledge and use of agricultural practices were limited, but early forms of irrigation were heavily utilized. Dams and ditches were constructed by Owens Valley Paiutes to control and direct natural river water toward wild seed plots which ultimately increased their natural yields. These chosen seed plots were selected based on their soil's drainage ability and yield production observed throughout Owens Valley Paiute history. Dams were constructed using natural materials such as sticks, stone, mud, and debris. Irrigation practices were most developed in the pitana patü district within the Owens Valley Paiute region, while other districts built similar structures at a smaller scale. A district would elect one individual to be responsible for irrigation management called tuvaijü (meaning "to irrigate"). To be awarded this position was a high honor in the community. After the tuvaijü was elected, they led dam construction efforts and were assisted by other tribal members to complete the labor-intensive builds. Once the dam or ditch was complete, the tuvaijü monitored and controlled all irrigation flow within their district.

Kaibab Paiute 
The Kaibab Paiute were a semi-sedentary group who resided in modern-day northern Arizona and southern Utah. Their diet relied on the abundant natural flora and fauna found within their territory: cacti, berries, trees, fruits, roots, rodents, big cats, reptiles, insects, and other herbivores. Kaibab Paiute people utilized their permanent water sources for garden irrigation. They grew maize, beans, and squash using water from the Kanab creek - a major perennial stream - and artesian springs along the Vermillion Cliffs. In the 1860s, Mormon settlers usurped all of the Kaibab Paiute's permanent water sources in order to continue their development. This contributed to a significant population decline of the Kaibab Paiute people. After the arrival of Mormon settlers, approximately 82% of Kaibab Paiutes died, most from starvation. In 1909, the Kaibab Indian Reservation was established and it currently houses 76 Kaibab Paiute people.

Chemeheuvi 
The Chemeheuvi are a tribal group who are spiritually connected with the land, plants, animals, and water of California, the Great Basin, and the Southwest. They believe that the Earth and all of its inhabitants were created by Hutsipamamauu (meaning "Ocean Woman"). Chemeheuvi elders believe water covered all of Earth's surface until a small worm fell from the sky and transformed into Hutsipamamauu. She created land by using her skin and dirt from her reproductive regions, mud from the ocean floor, and natural oils from her body. Hutsipamamauu extended the land mass by laying down and stretching her body. The Chemeheuvi accredit her for creating all geologic and aquatic features - including all water sources - that we know and see today.

Songs are an important feature of Chemeheuvi society and range in subject matter. Individuals owned songs and, therefore, owned the subjects and land discussed in the songs. Whoever owned a song about a particular area of land owned all of the plants, animals, and water sources within the region. Songs were the Chemeheuvi's version of contractual land ownership agreements and were passed down through generations.

The Chemeheuvi established permanent villages near water sources and springs. Village leaders sang about water sources located in their region and, therefore, claimed ownership of the land and all its features. Though water sources were owned by village leaders, other people could drink from the sources, but couldn't permanently use it in the same capacity as the leader. Springs provided abundant and active plant life of yucca, willow, cottonwood, mesquite, and other flora. Songs not only proclaim land and water ownership, but they were also used as directions to water sources, particularly in desert regions. The Chemeheuvi innovated canteens - baskets or animal stomachs that were coated in tar as a form of waterproofing - to store water and adapt to harsh conditions. Irrigation of the Colorado River enabled the Chemeheuvi to establish some agricultural plots. George Armstrong, a colonial outsider, reported that a half-mile irrigation ditch was built from the Colorado River to transport water to Chemeheuvi land. This water source supported native and non-native crops: maize, wheat, watermelon, potatoes, carrots, beets, and others.

Holy land traditions 
The Southern Paiute people believe in Puaxant Tuvip, or power land. It is their holy land that links to many significant landmarks in the Southern Paiutes memory and stories. For instance Nuvagantu, or Mt. Charleston in Nevada is a holy landmark that the Southern Paiute people believe was where they were created. These holy lands were places that the separate families or tribes would come to barter, trade, socialize and perform religious ceremonies. Another large landmark that is culturally significant to the Southern Paiutes is the Colorado river and the Grand Canyon. The modern-day importance of these Holy Lands is that the Southern Paiutes claim the supernaturally given right to know what happens and the impacts of any projects that occur in their holy lands.

Modern-day flag 
The Paiutes have a flag that was officially confirmed in 1997. Within it are several symbols for the tribe. First the colors, white symbolizes purity, the red and black are both for strength and power, and the yellow for healing and life. The biggest symbol is the eagle which represents their deity, then there are a series of images that relate to traditional songs and games the Southern Paiutes would play, the arrowheads that they were known for. Overall the image is supposed to represent a warrior's shield with the five eagle feathers hanging on the bottom representing the 5 modern-day tribes of the Southern Paiutes.

Traditional Southern Paiute bands 
The Southern Paiute traditionally had 16 to 31 subgroups, bands, or tribes.
 Ankakkani'kacimi (Un-ka-ka'-ni-guts, Unka-kanig-its, Oaw'tuhus'eng), "Yellow Mouth of Canyon People" in present Long Valley
 Antarianunts (Ute name with ending unts); Paiute name Yantarɨi, mixed Southern Paiute-Ute band from Escalante River east to Colorado River and southeast to Henry Mountains, Utah
 Beaver band (Kʷi?umpacíɨi, Kwiumpus, Quiumputs), "Frasera speciosa people", lived in Beaver Valley along Beaver River near today's Beaver, Utah, some intermarried with the Pahvant Ute band to the north living in the deserts near Sevier Lake
 Cedar band (Ankappanukkicɨcimɨ), Unkapanukuints, "Red-stream people", or Suh’dutsing, "Cedar people" from near Cedar City, Utah
 Chemehuevi (Nüwüwü, Tantáwats) Southernmost band of Southern Paiute People.
 Gunlock band (Matooshats, Matissatï was the name given them by the southwards living St. George band/Uainuints, they instead bestowed the term to Southern Paiute bands northeast of them), lived near Gunlock in southwest Utah
 Kaibab (Kai'vi'vits, Kaipapicɨcimɨ, Kaivavwits, Kaibabits, Kaipa'pici, Kaivavituvingui, "Mountain Lying Down People" the Kaibab Plateau and Kaibab National Forest in northern Arizona are named after them
 Indian Peak Band (Kwee’choovunt), "Peak People"
 Kaiparowits, "mountain home of the people", lived along the Escalante River and were hunting the Kaiparowits Plateau in Utah, therefore also known as Escalante band
 Las Vegas band (Nɨpakantɨcimɨ, Nuvagantucimi), "People of Charleston Peak"
 Moapa (Muapaa, Moapats), "Muddy Creek Paiute"
 Pahranagat (Pata?nikicɨ), "Person who sticks his feet in the water, named for the Pahranagat Valley, Nevada
 Panaca (Tsouwaraits, Matisabits), named for Panaca, Nevada
 Panguitch (Pakiucimi), "fish people", named for Panguitch, Utah
 San Juan band (Kwaiantikowkets), "People being over on the opposite side", from the San Juan River in northern Arizona
 Shivwits (Sipicimi, Shebits, Sübüts), "People who live in the East" or See’veetseng, "Whitish Earth People"
 Uinkaret (Yipinkatɨtɨcimɨ), "People of Mount Trumbull"
 Uainuints (Uenuwunts, also known as Tonaquints, hunted and farmed from Hebron (Shoal Creek Fort), Enterprise and Pinto southward along the Santa Clara River (also called Tonaquint River) to his mouth into the Virgin River south of today's Saint George, Utah, therefore called St. George Band)

Contemporary Southern Paiute federally recognized tribes 
 Kaibab Band of Paiute Indians of the Kaibab Indian Reservation, Arizona—Kaibab Indian Reservation, Arizona
 Las Vegas Tribe of Paiute Indians of the Las Vegas Indian Colony, Las Vegas, Nevada
 Moapa Band of Paiute Indians of the Moapa River Indian Reservation, Moapa River Indian Reservation, Moapa, Nevada
 Paiute Indian Tribe of Utah, Cedar City, Utah
 Cedar City Band of Paiutes
 Kanosh Band of Paiutes
 Koosharem Band of Paiutes
 Indian Peaks Band of Paiutes
 Shivwits Band of Paiutes
 San Juan Southern Paiute Tribe of Arizona, Tuba City, Arizona

Notable Southern Paiutes 
 Tony Tillohash, linguist and politician

Notes

References

Sources

Further reading

External links

Tribes 
  Paiute Indian Tribe of Utah

Language 
 Southern Paiute Collection of Charles Cairns at AILLA—contains audio recordings of words, phrases, and a story in the Southern Paiute language.

Other 
 "Removing Classrooms from the Battlefield: Liberty, Paternalism, and the Redemptive Promise of Educational Choice", 2008 BYU Law Review 377
 "The Piutes and the Legacy of Richard Henry Pratt"
 Traditional Southern Paiute Territory: Band Divisions
 Southern Paiute Tribal Boundary

 
Indigenous peoples of the Great Basin
Native American tribes in Arizona
Native American tribes in Nevada
Native American tribes in Utah
Indigenous weapons of the Americas
Archery in the United States